East Mid Intercourse Island is an uninhabited island in the Dampier Archipelago, in the Pilbara, Western Australia.

Its area about 41 hectares. It is connected by a causeway/bridge to the mainland and also to Mistaken Island further out.

The island is adjacent to the Dampier saltern and is used by Dampier Salt to carry salt to the port at Mistaken Island.

Nearby islands
 Intercourse Island
 Haycock Island (Western Australia)
 East Lewis Island
 East Intercourse Island
 Mistaken Island
 West Mid Intercourse Island
 West Intercourse Island

References

Dampier Archipelago
Uninhabited islands of Australia